The Government Gazette is the gazette of record of South Africa. It is the "official organ of Government". The Government Gazette is used by the government as an official way of communicating to the general public.

Published material

The Gazette includes proclamations by the President as well as both general and government notices made by its various departments. It publishes regulations and notices in terms of acts, changes of names, company registrations and deregistrations, financial statements, land restitution notices, liquor licence applications and transport permits. Board and legal notices are also published in the Gazette; these cover insolvencies, liquidation and estate notices. Note that certain publishers such as Juta and Butterworths publish legislation in South Africa.

Location
The current location of the government printing works is 149 Bosman Street, Pretoria, South Africa.

Notes and references

External links
 Government Printing Works compilation of issues
 Open Gazettes South Africa

Government of South Africa
Newspapers published in South Africa
Law of South Africa
South Africa, Government Gazette of